Pa Daet is a tambon (subdistrict) of Pa Daet District, in Chiang Rai Province, Thailand. In 2018 it had a total population of 6,494 people.

Administration

Central administration
The tambon is subdivided into 12 administrative villages (muban).

Local administration
The whole area of the subdistrict is covered by the subdistrict municipality (Thesaban Tambon) Pa Daet (เทศบาลตำบลป่าแดด).

References

External links
Thaitambon.com on Pa Daet

Tambon of Chiang Rai province
Populated places in Chiang Rai province